Tara Madelein De Vries (born 6 October 1998) is a Turkish-Dutch beauty pageant titleholder who won Miss Turkey Universe 2018. She represented Turkey in Miss Universe 2018. De Vries was born in the Netherlands to a Dutch father and Turkish mother, and moved to Turkey at age 12. She studies economics and administration at Koç University.

Her mother, was also crowned Miss Turkey in 1992.

References 

1999 births
Living people
Miss Universe 2018 contestants
Dutch emigrants to Turkey
Dutch people of Turkish descent
Models from Istanbul
Turkish beauty pageant winners
Turkish people of Dutch descent